Bob Rohrbach is a retired U.S. professional soccer forward who spent three seasons in the North American Soccer League, one in the Major Indoor Soccer League and one in the American Soccer League.

As an excellent basketball player his senior season in high school, Rohrbach attempted to gain an athletic scholarship.  When no schools expressed an interest, he decided to attend the University of Dayton and walk on with the basketball team.  During pre-season practices, he decided to also try out with the school's soccer team.  He played on the men's soccer team from 1973 to 1977 scoring 69 goals career goals.  He was inducted into the school's Hall of Fame in 1993.  He turned professional in 1977 with the New York Cosmos of the North American Soccer League, but saw no first team time.  In 1978, he moved to the Colorado Caribous where he was a regular starter.  He went to the Detroit Express in 1979.  In 1979, he began the Major Indoor Soccer League season with the Pittsburgh Spirit but finished it with the Hartford Hellions.  In April 1980, he was playing for the Columbus Magic whene he collided heads with another player.  The collision put him into a coma for four days and ended his soccer career.

In the early 1990s, he co-owned an oil field equipment company, R&R Procurement.

References

External links
NASL/MISL stats

1954 births
Living people
American Soccer League (1933–1983) players
American soccer players
Colorado Caribous players
Columbus Magic players
Dayton Flyers men's soccer players
Detroit Express players
Hartford Hellions players
Association football forwards
Major Indoor Soccer League (1978–1992) players
New York Cosmos players
North American Soccer League (1968–1984) players
Pittsburgh Spirit players
People from Garden City, New York
Soccer players from New York (state)